

The DFW Mars was an early German military utility aircraft built in 1913 and was the first original design manufactured by DFW. The aircraft was produced in both monoplane and biplane versions, which shared a common fuselage and empennage. The monoplane version featured wings that were wire-braced to a kingpost on the forward fuselage, and was powered by a 71 kW (90 hp) NAG engine. Examples of the monoplane built as dedicated trainer aircraft also incorporated a reinforcing truss beneath the wings. The biplane had conventional three-bay wings of unequal span and was powered by a 75 kW (100 hp) Mercedes engine. The wings of both the monoplane and biplane versions featured prominent sweepback.

Mars aircraft distinguished themselves in pre-war passenger-carrying feats and reliability trials, and were purchased by both the German military and the British Admiralty, which purchased an example for the RNAS. Turkish Mars aircraft were flown in the First and Second Balkan Wars in 1912-1913 and the type is therefore believed to be the first German-built aircraft to have seen active military service.

Specifications (biplane)

References

Bibliography

External links

 "The D.F.W. Monoplane" Flight 8 November 1913, pp 1216–18
 "The D.F.W. Biplane at Brooklands" Flight 13 December 1913, 1374
 "The D.F.W. Biplane" Flight 10 January 1914, pp 34–38

1910s German military utility aircraft
Mars
Single-engined tractor aircraft
High-wing aircraft
Biplanes
Aircraft first flown in 1913